Charlotte Wingfield (born 30 November 1994) is a Maltese sprinter who competes on behalf of the Republic of Malta.

She competed at the 2015 World Championships in Athletics and 2016 IAAF World Indoor Championships. She switched her allegiance from Great Britain in 2015 to represent Malta, her father's country of origin.

She competed for Malta at the 2016 Summer Olympics in Rio de Janeiro in the 100 metres event. 
She finished 8th in her heat and did not qualify for the semifinals. She was the flag bearer for Malta during the closing ceremony.

Personal life
Born in England, Wingfield is of Maltese descent through her father and holds dual English-Maltese citizenship.

Competition record

Personal bests
Outdoor
100 metres – 11.54 (+1.1 m/s, Malta, 2017) NR
200 metres – 23.78 (+0.3 m/s, San Marino, 2017)NR
Indoor
60 metres – 7.44 (Cardiff 2017) NR
200 metres – 24.10 (Sheffield 2017)'''NR

References

External links
A minimal crowd but Charlotte Wingfield's perfect Olympic moment shines through all the same
http://www.european-athletics.org/athletes/group=w/athlete=128783-wingfield-charlotte/index.html

1994 births
Living people
Athletes from London
Maltese female sprinters
British female sprinters
English people of Maltese descent
People with acquired Maltese citizenship
World Athletics Championships athletes for Malta
Olympic athletes of Malta
Athletes (track and field) at the 2016 Summer Olympics
Athletes (track and field) at the 2018 Commonwealth Games
Commonwealth Games competitors for Malta
European Games competitors for Malta
Athletes (track and field) at the 2015 European Games
Olympic female sprinters